Aung Kyaw Myat is a former deputy Minister of the Ministry of Science and Technology, appointed by President Thein Sein.

Early life and education 
Aung Kyaw Myat was born on 18 July 1955 in Katha, Myanmar. He graduated with Civil engineer degree in  Yangon Technological University.

In office
He is also a former Director General of the Department of Advanced Science and Technology. He became deputy minister for the Ministry of Science and Technology on 25 July 2013.

References

External links
https://www.facebook.com/aungkyaw.myat.545

Living people
People from Yangon Region
University of Yangon alumni
1955 births